Gunupur Airstrip is a public airstrip owned by Government of Odisha located at Gunupur in the Rayagada district of Odisha. Nearest airport to this airstrip is Jeypore Airport in Jeypore, Odisha.

References

Airports in Odisha
Rayagada district
Airports with year of establishment missing